Jemima West (born 11 August 1987) is a French actress. She is bilingual, growing up for most of her life in Paris, France. She is best known for playing Isabelle Lightwood in the film adaptation of The Mortal Instruments: City of Bones and Alice Whelan in the British drama series Indian Summers. She also appeared in the second season of The Borgias as Vittoria.

Early life
West's parents are English. Her father is an accountant and her mother is a business interpreter. When she was five years old, her parents moved to Paris. She attended the Sorbonne and graduated in the history of art while taking acting classes in the evening. She can speak both French and English. She has described herself as completely English and has said that she has an easier time working in her mother tongue; she says Paris is her home.

Career
West made her acting début at the age of 12 when she appeared in the 1999 film Joan Of Arc, directed by Luc Besson. She later on starred in the short film I'm an Actrice directed by Maïwenn, and also starred in the third season of the Canadian television series, 15/Love.

West later went on to star in the French television shows Ben & Thomas, Trouble Paradis, R.I.S. Police Scientifique and Josephine Ange Gardien which was followed by her second film role in King Guillaume, co-starring alongside Florence Foresti.

In 2009, West starred in Paradis Criminel, a two-part thriller mini-series entitled Who Killed Little Red Riding Hood as Louisa. The mini-series was written and directed by Serge Meynard and went on to win "Best mini-series" at the 2009 La Rochelle TV Film Festival, and garnered 3 million viewers on France 2 on 22 August 2012. The mini-series thus ranks as 8th best-rated fiction of the year on the channel.

In 2010, West had a role in the French mini-series Maison Close, in which she starred as Rose, a young country girl forced to work for her freedom in a brothel. She stars alongside Anne Charrier and Valérie Karsenti.

West played Isabelle Lightwood in The Mortal Instruments: City of Bones, a film adaptation of the first book in The New York Times best-selling series The Mortal Instruments, written by Cassandra Clare. West co-starred alongside Lily Collins, Jamie Campbell Bower, and Robert Sheehan. The film was released on 21 August 2013.

Filmography

Film

Television

References

External links

1987 births
Living people
Actresses from Paris
20th-century French actresses
21st-century French actresses
French film actresses
French television actresses
French people of English descent
French child actresses
Place of birth missing (living people)